The 2015–16 Arizona State Sun Devils women's basketball team represented Arizona State University during the 2015–16 NCAA Division I women's basketball season. The Sun Devils, led by nineteenth year head coach Charli Turner Thorne, played their games at the Wells Fargo Arena and were members of the Pac-12 Conference. They finished the season 26–7, 16–2 in Pac-12 play to share the Pac-12 regular season title with Oregon State. They lost in the quarterfinals of the Pac-12 women's tournament to California. They received at-large bid of the NCAA women's tournament where they defeated New Mexico State in the first round before getting upset by Tennessee in the second round.

Roster

Schedule

|-
!colspan=9 style="background:#990033; color:#FFB310;"| Non-conference regular season

|-
!colspan=9 style="background:#990033; color:#FFB310;"| Pac-12 regular season

|-
!colspan=9 style="background:#990033;"| Pac-12 Women's Tournament

|-
!colspan=9 style="background:#990033;"| NCAA Women's Tournament

Rankings
2015–16 NCAA Division I women's basketball rankings

See also
 2015–16 Arizona State Sun Devils men's basketball team

References

Arizona State Sun Devils women's basketball seasons
Arizona State
Arizona State
Arizona State Sun Devils women's basketball
Arizona State Sun Devils women's basketball